Nichols' worm eel (Scolecenchelys nicholsae) is an eel in the family Ophichthidae (worm/snake eels). It was described by Edgar Ravenswood Waite in 1904, originally under the genus Muraenichthys.

It is a marine, subtropical eel which is known from Lord Howe Island and Norfolk Island, in the southwestern Pacific Ocean.

References

Nichols' worm eel
Fish of Lord Howe Island
Fauna of Norfolk Island
Nichols' worm eel